Catalina Robayo Vargas (born May 12, 1989) is a Colombian model, TV host, and beauty queen who was crowned Miss Colombia in 2010.

Early life
Robayo was born on May 12, 1989, in Cali, Cauca Valley to Valentin Robayo and Katty Ruth Robayo Vargas. She studied law at the Pontifical Xavierian University.

Pageantry

Miss Colombia 2010

Robayo represented her native department Valle, in the 58th edition of Miss Colombia, held on November 15, 2010, in Cartagena, Bolivar, crowning herself as Miss Colombia 2010, being the ninth time in history in which a representative of this department is crowned as Miss Colombia.

Miss Universe 2011

As Miss Colombia 2010, one of her responsibilities was to represent the country in Miss Universe 2011, held on September 12, 2011, in the city of Sao Paulo, Brazil, where she placed in the top 16 final.

References

1989 births
Living people
People from Cali
Colombian female models
Miss Colombia winners
Miss Universe 2011 contestants
Colombian beauty pageant winners
Colombian women television presenters
Colombian television presenters
Pontifical Xavierian University alumni